Susan Hackwood is the executive director of the California Council on Science and Technology (CCST).  She is a professor and researcher of electrical engineering credited for inventing the concept of electrowetting with Gerardo Beni in 1981.

Hackwood is married to Gerardo Beni.  They have two children, Catherine and Juliet. Notably, both children received Ph.Ds before their 21st birthday.

Education
In 1976, Hackwood was admitted to the degree of Bachelor of Science with Honours in Combined Science at DeMontfort University in Leicester, UK after three years of studies (the norm for undergraduates in the UK).  She received her PhD in 'Solid State Ionics' from DeMontfort in 1979, having also worked at UC Berkeley and Chalmers Institute of Technology in Gothenburg, Sweden.

Career
Hackwood is currently a professor of electrical engineering at UC Riverside, and former Dean of the UC Riverside College of Engineering.  She has been the executive director of CCST since 1995. Prior to moving to UC Riverside in 1990, she was a professor at UC Santa Barbara and also worked at AT&T Bell Laboratories, in the Robotics Research department. She cofounded the Journal of Robotic Systems in 1984 with Gerardo Beni.

References

External links
 Hackwood's homepage at CCST
 Hackwood's homepage at UCR

American electrical engineers
Living people
Year of birth missing (living people)
University of California, Riverside faculty
Engineers from California